Coenodomus melanochlora is a species of snout moth in the genus Coenodomus. It is known from Singapore.

References

Moths described in 1916
Epipaschiinae